Marcia Muller (born September 28, 1944) is an American author of fictional mystery and thriller novels.

Muller has written many novels featuring her Sharon McCone female private detective character.  Vanishing Point won the Shamus Award for Best P.I. Novel. Muller had been nominated for the Shamus Award four times previously.

In 2005, Muller was awarded the Mystery Writers of America's Grand Master award.

She was born in Detroit, Michigan, and grew up in Birmingham, Michigan, and graduated in English from the University of Michigan and worked as a journalist at Sunset magazine. She is married to detective fiction author Bill Pronzini with whom she has collaborated on several novels.

Sharon McCone Series
{{columns-list|colwidth=32em|
 Edwin of the Iron Shoes (October, 1977)
 Ask the Cards A Question (May, 1982)
 The Cheshire Cat's Eye (January, 1983)
 Games to Keep the Dark Away (1984)
 Leave A Message for Willie (September, 1984)
 Double (October, 1984) (co-written with her husband, Bill Pronzini)
 There's Nothing to Be Afraid of (August, 1985)
 Eye of the Storm (March, 1988)
 There's Something in A Sunday (January, 1989)
 The Shape of Dread (November, 1989)
 Trophies and Dead Things (September, 1990)
 Where Echoes Live (July, 1991)
 Pennies on A Dead Woman's Eyes (July, 1992)
 Wolf in the Shadows (July, 1993)
 Till the Butchers Cut Him Down (July, 1994)
 A Wild and Lonely Place (August, 1995)
 The Broken Promise Land (June, 1996)
 Both Ends of the Night (July, 1997)
 While Other People Sleep (July, 1998)
 A Walk Through the Fire (May, 1999)
 Listen to the Silence (July, 2000)
 Dead Midnight (July, 2002)
 The Dangerous Hour (July, 2004)
 Vanishing Point (July, 2006)
 The Ever-Running Man (July, 2007)
 Burn Out (October, 2008)
 Locked In (October, 2009)
 Coming Back (October, 2010)
 City of Whispers (October, 2011)
 Looking For Yesterday (November, 2012)
 The Night Searchers (July, 2014)
 Someone Always Knows (July, 2016)
 The Color of Fear (August, 2017)
 The Breakers (August, 2018)
 Ice and Stone (August, 2021)
 The McCone Files (Crippen & Landru,1994) (short story collection)
 McCone and Friends (Crippen & Landru,1999) (short story collection)
}}

Other works

Carpenter and Quincannon Mysteries
 The Bughouse Affair (2013) (co-written with Bill Pronzini)
 The Spook Lights Affair (2013) (co-written with Bill Pronzini)
 The Body Snatchers Affair (2015) (co-written with Bill Pronzini)
 The Plagues of Thieves Affair (2016) (co-written with Bill Pronzini)
 Dangerous Ladies Affair (2017) (co-written with Bill Pronzini)

Elena Oliverez series
 The Tree of Death (1983)
 The Legend of the Slain Soldiers (1985)
 Beyond the Grave (1986) (co-written with Bill Pronzini)

Joanna Stark series
 The Cavalier in White (1986)
 There Hangs the Knife (1988)
 Dark Star (1989)

Soledad County series
 Point Deception (2001)
 Cyanide Wells (2003)
 Cape Perdido (2005)

Anthologies and collections
 The Web She Weaves (1983) (co-written with Bill Pronzini)
 Witches Brew: Horror and Supernatural Stories by Women (1984) (co-written with Bill Pronzini)
 Child's Ploy: An Anthology of Mystery and Suspense Stories (1984) (co-written with Bill Pronzini)
 She Won the West: An Anthology of Western and Frontier Stories by Women (1985) (co-written with Bill Pronzini)
 Dark Lessons: Crime and Detection on Campus (1985) (co-written with Bill Pronzini)
 Kill or Cure: Suspense Stories About the World of Medicine (1985) (co-written with Bill Pronzini)
 The Deadly Arts: A Collection of Artful Suspense (1985) (co-written with Bill Pronzini)
 Chapter and Hearse: Suspense Stories About the World of Books (1985) (co-written with Bill Pronzini)
 The Wickedest Show on Earth: A Carnival of Circus Suspense (1985) (co-written with Bill Pronzini)
 Lady on the Case: 21 Stories and 1 Complete Novel Starring the World's Great Female Sleuths (1988) (co-written with Bill Pronzini and Martin H. Greenberg)
 Deceptions (1991) (short story collection)
 Detective Duos: The Best Adventures of Twenty-Five Crime-Solving Twosomes (1997) (co-written with Bill Pronzini)
 Duo (1998) (short story collection) (co-written with Bill Pronzini)
 Time of the Wolves (2003) (Western short story collection)
 Somewhere in the City (2007) (short story collection)
 Crucifixion River (2007) (short story collection) (co-written with Bill Pronzini)

Non-fiction
 1001 Midnights: The Aficionado's Guide to Mystery and Detective Fiction (1986) (co-written with Bill Pronzini)

Stand alone novels
 The Lighthouse'' (1987) (co-written with Bill Pronzini)

References

External links
Marcia Muller's Official Website

1944 births
Living people
20th-century American novelists
21st-century American novelists
American mystery writers
American women novelists
Anthony Award winners
Edgar Award winners
Macavity Award winners
Shamus Award winners
University of Michigan College of Literature, Science, and the Arts alumni
Writers from Detroit
Women mystery writers
20th-century American women writers
21st-century American women writers
Novelists from Michigan